The Mind of Gil Scott-Heron (subtitled A Collection of Poetry and Music) is a 1978 album by spoken word and rap pioneer Gil Scott-Heron.  Like many of Scott-Heron's albums, the album's content primarily addresses political and social issues; however, The Mind of Gil Scott-Heron relies far more on his spoken word delivery than his other albums.  Whereas much of the artist's earlier albums contained backup jazz-funk music from Brian Jackson, many of these tracks, which address contemporary issues such as Watergate, the pardon of Richard Nixon and the Attica Prison riot, are either live recordings or studio-recorded songs with little more than sparse drum backing or occasional instrumentation. Many of the tracks featured were included on previous Gil Scott-Heron albums.

Due to the length of some of the pieces –  "The Ghetto Code (Dot Dot Dit Dit Dot Dot Dash)" is nearly 13 minutes long, and four other songs are longer than 7 minutes –  the album consists of only seven songs.

One of the distinctive characteristics of Heron's poetry on this album is his use of chemical formulas to refer to certain people and events.  For example, he refers to Barry Goldwater as "Barry AuH2O" and Watergate as "H2OGaTe".

The original vinyl release of the album contained a 24-page booklet featuring transcriptions of 22 Gil Scott-Heron compositions. The CD release also features a different cover than the original vinyl release.

Track listing
All songs written by Gil Scott-Heron

Side A
1. "H2O Gate Blues" – 7:58 (about the Watergate break-in and cover-up) (from Winter in America)
2. "We Beg Your Pardon (Pardon our Analysis)" – 7:52 (about the pardon of Richard Nixon) (from The First Minute of a New Day)
3. "The New Deal" – 3:10

Side B
4. "Jose Campos Torres" – 2:36 (about Jose Campos Torres, a U.S. Army veteran who was arrested and then murdered and tossed into a bayou by two police officers in Houston in 1978, spurring the Moody Park Riot)
5. "The Ghetto Code (Dot Dot Dit Dit Dot Dot Dash)" – 12:57
6. "Bicentennial Blues" – 8:39 (from It's Your World)

2000 Bonus Track
7. "Space Shuttle" – 7:28

Personnel
Gil Scott-Heron - narrator
with:
Danny Bowens - bass on "H2O Blues"; keyboards on "Space Shuttle"
Brian Jackson - piano on "H2O Blues"
Bob Adams - drums on "H2O Blues"
Malcolm Cecil - bass, synthesizer on "Jose Campos Torres"
Robbie Gordon - bass on "Space Shuttle"
Paul Weller - keyboards on "Space Shuttle"

References

1978 albums
Gil Scott-Heron albums
Spoken word albums by American artists
Arista Records albums

External links
Chart History Billboard magazine